This college in Ludhiana is a college located in Ludhiana, Punjab, India. It was built in 1946. The members of the Arya Samaj got together in 1945 and decided to build the college which would cater to the needs of many people in Ludhiana. 

The section of the school enrolling female students was started in 1970. In the same year the post graduate courses in Political Science and History were also started.

Notable alumni
 Sat Paul Mittal
 Sunil Mittal
 Sharanjit Singh Dhillon
 Arun Bakshi

External links
Official website

Education in Ludhiana
Universities and colleges in Punjab, India
Educational institutions established in 1946
Universities and colleges affiliated with the Arya Samaj
1946 establishments in India